Instinctual may refer to:

Instinct, the inherent inclination of a living organism
Instinctual, single by ElectroVamp 2014
Instinctual (Romanthony album) 1999
Instinctual (song) by Imagination